Geri Selita (born 8 March 2001) is an Albanian professional footballer who plays as a forward for Besa Kavajë.

Career statistics

Club

References

2001 births
Living people
Footballers from Kavajë
Albanian footballers
Association football midfielders
Albania youth international footballers
Besa Kavajë players